This is a list of superhero films produced by American film studios by year.

DC and Marvel

 List of films based on DC Comics publications
 List of films based on Marvel Comics publications

Independents

 List of television series and films based on Archie Comics publications
 List of television series and films based on Boom! Studios publications
 List of television series and films based on Dark Horse Comics publications
 List of television series and films based on Harvey Comics publications
 List of television series and films based on IDW Publishing publications
 List of television series and films based on Image Comics publications
 List of television series and films based on Oni Press publications

Character based

 List of James Bond films
 List of Star Trek films
 List of Star Wars films
List of Tarzan films

Live-action

Live-action feature films

Upcoming

Movie serials

Animated

Upcoming

See also
 List of Indian superhero films
 List of superhero productions created by Toei
 List of films based on comics
 List of films based on comic strips
 List of films based on English-language comics
 List of films based on French-language comics
 List of films based on manga
 List of films based on radio series
 List of films based on video games
 List of television programs based on comics
 List of superhero television series
 List of highest-grossing superhero films
List of films based on Plup Magazine

References

 
American superhero
Superhero